Nanzhili, formerly romanized as  and also known as South or Southern Zhili or Chih-li, was a historical province of the Ming Empire. Its capital was Nanjing, from which it is also sometimes known as Nanjing or Nanking Province. Nanzhili combined areas of the Yuan provinces of Henan Jiangbei and Jiangzhe and took its nameChinese for "Southern Directly Administered Area"from Nanjing's status as the Ming's national capital under the Hongwu Emperor and as the secondary capital after the Yongle Emperor's move to Beijing, which oversaw Beizhili or the Northern Directly Administered Area. During the early Qing Dynasty, Nanzhili was renamed Jiangnan and then divided into the separate provinces of Jiangsu and Anhui. Under the Republic and People's Republic of China, an area of Jiangsu also became the provincial-level municipality of Shanghai.

See also
 Zhili & North Zhili
 Jiangsu, Anhui, & Shanghai

References

Former provinces of China
History of Jiangsu
History of Shanghai
History of Anhui